Golden Hills Wind Project is a electricity generating wind farm facility in Sherman County, Oregon. The original plan in 2009 by BP Alternative Energy was to generate a peak of 400 megawatts, with an average of 133 MW of wind power across  using up to 267 wind turbines. A new plan with 51 turbines generating 200 MW was expected to begin construction in 2021. It began operation in 2022.

See also

List of wind farms in the United States
Wind power in Oregon

References

External links
 Golden Hills Wind LLC
 Oregon DOE - Golden Hills Wind Project Page

Buildings and structures in Sherman County, Oregon
Wind farms in Oregon